Fenomeno may refer to:

 "Fenomeno" (song), a 1998 single by Vasilis Karras
 Fenomeno (album), a 2017 album by Fabri Fibra
 Fenomeno (horse), a Japanese Thoroughbred racehorse and sire
O Fenômeno, a nickname for Ronaldo (Brazilian footballer)